The Military ranks of Serbia are the military insignia used by the Serbian Armed Forces.

Current ranks of the Serbian Armed Forces
Note: Serbian River Flotilla is a brigade-level brown water naval branch of the Serbian Armed Forces, subordinated to the Serbian Army.

Officers
The rank insignia of commissioned officers.

Enlisted
The rank insignia of non-commissioned officers and enlisted personnel.

Historical ranks

Following the unification of the Kingdom of Serbia into Kingdom SHS (later Kingdom Yugoslavia), the ranks were replaced with the Military ranks of the Kingdom of Yugoslavia.

Commissioned officer ranks
There were only three general ranks in Serbian Royal Army: General (from 1872), Army General (from 1900 to 1901) and Vojvoda (from 1901). Four general ranks were used in Kingdom of Serbs, Croats, and Slovenes in 1923, and lasted until 1945. There were only two types of shoulder cords: with double-headed eagle and coat of arms of Kingdom of SHS or Kingdom of Yugoslavia for Vojvoda and without for all other General ranks. The different general grades were indicated by 6-pointed stars on the cuffs. Also the backing cloth for the shoulder cords was light blue for army general (was honorary rank in the period from 1900–1901) and divisional generals and in a colour of service for brigadier general. During the Middle Ages, the Vojvoda was a military commander rank and a noble titule. In the Balkan Wars and World War I this title was used to designate the highest military rank in Serbian Army and later Royal Yugoslav Army (above the General - as equivalent of Field Marshal in other armies). This rank was introduced by the law on the Organization of the Army Kingdom of Serbia in 1901. It has been awarded only during the war for: special merits of top generals. The first Vojvoda was promoted by the Great military decree of the Kingdom of Serbia on 20 October 1912. Only four people ever officially held that military rank: Radomir Putnik (got it in 1912), Stepa Stepanović (1914), Živojin Mišić (1914) and Petar Bojović (1918). 

The rank insignia of commissioned officers.

Other ranks
The rank insignia of non-commissioned officers and enlisted personnel.

See also
 Military ranks of the Kingdom of Yugoslavia
 Yugoslav People's Army ranks
 Ranks and insignia of the Armed Forces of Serbia and Montenegro

References

External links

 

 
Ranks